Charles Preston Cary (January 28, 1856 – 1943) was an American educator.

Cary had German and English ancestry. Born in Marshall, Ohio, he went to Ohio Central Normal School and worked in education in Ohio, Kansas, and Nebraska. In 1893, he moved to Wisconsin and was the head of the Milwaukee State Normal School training department (now University of Wisconsin–Milwaukee). He received his bachelor's degree from University of Chicago. He served as Wisconsin Superintendent of Public Instruction from 1903 to 1921.

Cary was a Republican.

References

1856 births
1943 deaths
American people of English descent
American people of German descent
Educators from Wisconsin
People from Highland County, Ohio
Superintendents of Public Instruction of Wisconsin
University of Chicago alumni
University of Wisconsin–Milwaukee faculty
Wisconsin Republicans